Tribute to Éric Rohmer (a.k.a. Maurice Schérer) is a short 2010 video commissioned by Les Films du Losange as a tribute to Éric Rohmer by his friend and former colleague Jean-Luc Godard, and is the work that directly precedes the release of the 2010 feature Film Socialisme in Godard's filmography. It was first presented at the Soirée en hommage à Éric Rohmer on 8 February 2010 at the Cinémathèque Française. The short film consists of various titles of articles that Rohmer wrote for Cahiers du Cinéma appearing on a black background as Godard's narration muses about brief, fragmented memories of Rohmer. It ends with a shot of Godard looking directly into the camera, the 16:9 image's aspect ratio suddenly squished into 4:3, as he finishes his monologue.

References

External links
 
 Hommage to Éric Rohmer by Jean-Luc Godard

2010 films
Swiss short films
Films directed by Jean-Luc Godard
2010s French-language films
French short films
Éric Rohmer
2010s French films